This is a list of sites and monuments of historic value that are maintained by the National Museums of Kenya.

Historic sites 

|}

See also 
 List of museums in Kenya

References

External links 

Museums in Kenya
Natural history museums
Kenya
Monumnts

Kenya
Sites and monuments